The Logan Subdivision is a railroad line owned by CSX Transportation in the U.S. state of West Virginia. It was formerly part of the CSX Huntington East Division. It became part of the CSX Florence Division on June 20, 2016. At its north end the line continues south from the Kanawha Subdivision and at its south end the line connects with Norfolk Southern.

See also
 List of CSX Transportation lines

References

CSX Transportation lines
Rail infrastructure in West Virginia